John "Johnny" Hoiles (born 11 August 1938) is a former Australian rules footballer who played with Footscray in the Victorian Football League (VFL).

Hoiles, who was a blacksmith, played as a key defender for Footscray, after starting his career as a ruckman. He was used as a centre half-back in the 1961 VFL Grand Final, which Footscray lost to Hawthorn.

From midway through the 1959 VFL season until the end of the 1964 season, Hoiles put together 101 consecutive games. He didn't extend the streak further in 1965 and instead signed with Ovens & Murray Football League (OMFL) side Corowa, as captain-coach. Following his stint as coach, Hoiles played in Corowa's 1968 premiership, their first since 1932.

He has a son, also named John, who played for Geelong during the 1980s.

References

Links
1968 O&MFL Premiers: Corowa FC team photo

1938 births
Australian rules footballers from Victoria (Australia)
Western Bulldogs players
Corowa Football Club players
Corowa Football Club coaches
Living people